Stadskanaal airfield  is a small ultralight aviation only airfield in the Netherlands  east of Stadskanaal in the province Groningen. It has one  grass runway in the direction 06/24.

References

External links
ULV.nl - Microlight flying club Westerwolde (Dutch only)
Aviationweb deja vu - Stadskanaal airfield
Airliners.net - Photos taken at Stadskanaal airfield

Airports in Groningen (province)
Stadskanaal